Priit Pärn (born 26 August 1946 in Tallinn) is an Estonian cartoonist and animation director whose films have enjoyed success among critics as well as the public at various film festivals.

Pärn formerly worked as a plant ecologist; his career in animation began when he accepted Rein Raamat's proposal to make a design for Kilplased (1974). After a brief apprenticeship in Joonisfilm, he directed his first film Is the Earth Round? in 1977.

Pärn's most important films are considered to be Triangle (1982), Breakfast on the Grass (1987), Hotel E (1992), 1895 (co-directed by Janno Põldma, 1995) and Night of the Carrots (1998).

Pärn's style is characterized by black humour, playful surrealism and a unique graphic style. His somewhat crude style marked the departure from both Rein Raamat's overtly serious and moralizing films as well as the Disneyesque style propagated by the directors of Soyuzmultfilm. In his footsteps (and occasionally copying his style to a large degree) have followed numerous new generation Estonian film makers, most notably Ülo Pikkov and Priit Tender.

Influences of Pärn's graphical style can also be seen in such commercial animated series as Rugrats and AAAHH!!! Real Monsters! directed by Igor Kovalyov.

In 2002 Pärn was awarded the Lifetime Achievement Award from the International Animated Film Association, and he received Lifetime Achievement Award at the World Festival of Animated Film - Animafest Zagreb in 2008.

Divers in the Rain (2010), co-directed with his wife Olga Pärn, became the most successful Estonian animated film of all time with its 18th award at KROK International Animated Film Festival in Ukraine.

Pärn had taught animation at the Arts Academy of the Turku University of Applied Sciences in Turku, Finland since 1994 and now he is teaching at Estonian Academy of Arts.

Animated films

Is The Earth Round? (Kas maakera on ümmargune?, 1977)
...And Plays Tricks (...Ja teeb trikke, 1978)
The best children's film from 2nd Varna Animated Film Festival, Bulgaria 1981
Exercises in Preparation For Independent Life (1980)
2nd Prize at the 15th USSR filmfestival, 1981
The Triangle (Kolmnurk, 1982)
Time Out (Aeg maha, 1984)
Grand Prix Varna Animated Film Festival, Bulgaria 1985
1st Prize from the International Animated Film Festival Cinanima in Espinho , Portugal 1985
Best animated film Bilbao Short Film Festival, Spain 1985
Breakfast on the Grass (Eine murul, 1987)
Grand Prix from the XVIII Tampere Short Film Festival, Finland 1988
Grand Prix, best film in category C and critics prize from VIII Zagreb World Festival of Animated Films, 1988
3rd Audience Prize from Short Film Festival in Bonn, Germany 1988
1st Prize in category C from 1st Animated Film Festival in Shanghai, 1988
Grand Prix from the International Animated Film Festival Cinanima in Espinho , Portugal 1988
1st Prize from the XXI USSR Film Festival in Baku, 1988
Best Animated Film Award from Melbourne Film Festival, Australia 1988
3rd Prize from VIII Odense Film Festival, Denmark 1989
Nika – the highest prize of the USSR film industry 1989
Commercial spot: Switch Off The Lights (Kustuta valgus, 1988)
Bronze Lion 35thCannes International Advertising Festival, France 1988
Hotel E (1992)
Prize of Land Baden-Württemberg from International Festival of Animated Film in Stuttgart , Germany 1992
1895 (1995)  (co-director Janno Põldma )
3rd Prize, awarded by festival's youth jury from 11th International Odense Film Festival 1995 (Denmark)
The Prize of Russian ASIFA from 3rd International Animated Film Festival Krok 95, Ukraine 1995
The Russian Critics' Prize from 3rd International Animated Film Festival Krok 95, Ukraine 1995
Prize in Class C, awarded by International Jury from 19th International Animated Film Festival of Espinho Cinanima , Portugal 1995
The Estonian Film Critics (FIPRESCI) Prize for the best film of the year 1995
Estonian Cultural Endowment's annual Johannes Pääsuke Award 1995
The Republic of Estonia's State Cultural Award for the film "1895" in the year 1995
The Festival Jury Special Prize from Balticum Film & TV Festival  in Bornholm, Denmark 1996
Best Film Award from Oslo Animation Festival , Norway 1996
Grand Prix from 12th World Festival of Animated Films in Zagreb, Croatia 1996
The Critics' Award given by the Jury of the Association of Croatian Film Critics, Croatia 1996
Magic Chrystal Prize 6th International Film Forum Arsenals in Riga, Latvia 1996
Best Design Award from Ottawa International Animation Festival , Canada 1996
Grand Prix from Pärnu Film Days, Estonia 1997
Prize for Outstanding Film in General Category from '97 Seoul Animation Expo, South-Korea 1997
Commercial spot: Deliss (1995)
Commercial spot: Absolut Pärn (1996)
Diploma from International Animated Film Festival Krok 97, Ukraine 1997
Diploma from Holland Animated Film Festival  in Utrecht, the Netherlands 1996
Free Action (1996)
Night of the Carrots (Porgandite öö, 1998) 
Grand Prix from Ottawa International Animation Festival , Canada 1998
Special Jury Prize from Oslo Animation Festival , Norway 1999
2nd Prize Silver Dove from 42nd International Leipzig Festival of Documentary and Animated Film, Germany 1999
1stPrize from World Animation Celebration Competition, Los Angeles, USA 2000
Karl And Marilyn (Karl ja Marilyn, 2003)
Best International Film at FAN International Animation Festival, UK 2003
Special Jury Award from 16th World Festival of Animated Films in Zagreb, Croatia2004
Frank And Wendy (Frank ja Wendy, 2003–2005) (co-authors: P.Tender, Ü.Pikkov, K.Jancis / joonisfilm 7 x 9,5 min)
 Estonian Cultural Endowment's Prize for the best Animated Film "Frank ja Wendy" in the year 2005
 Newspaper Eesti Ekspress cultural extra Prize of the year 2005
 Audience best animated film prize from film festival de Cinema & Video in Portugal, 2006
I Feel Back of My Head (Ma kuklas tunnen 2007) (co-director O.Marchenko / 2 min / 35 mm / short story from animated film Black Ceiling)
Life Without Gabriella Ferri (Elu Ilma Gabriella Ferrita, 2008) 
Grand Prix from the 12th Holland International Animated Film Festival, Utrecht, Holland 2008
Grand Prix and the Anoba nomination for the Best Animated Film in the Baltic and Nordic countries from the Animated Dreams Animated Film Festival, Estonia 2008
Scottish Leader Estonian Film Award, Black Nights Film Festival 2008, Estonia 2008
Estonian Cultural Endowment's award for Best Animation, 2008
Jury Special Mention, World Festival of Animated Film - Animafest Zagreb, Croatia 2009
ANOBA prize, 2009
Grand Prix, I Castelli Animati, Italia, 2009
Jury Special Prize, MONSTRA IAFF, Portugal 2011
Divers in the Rain (Tuukrid Vihmas, 2010)  (co-director Olga Pärn )
Silver Jabberwocky prize from the 16th Etiuda&Anima Film Festival, Poland 2009
Don Quixote – International Federation of Film Societies Award from the 16th Etiuda&Anima Film Festival, Poland 2009
Grand Prix from Anima, the International Animation Film Festival of Brussels, Belgium 2010
Grand Prix from the MONSTRA – Lisbon Animation Film Festival, Portugal 2010
Best Sound Track award from the MONSTRA – Lisbon Animation Film Festival, Portugal 2010
Grand Prix from the World Festival of Animated Film - Animafest Zagreb, Croatia 2010
Hiroshima Prize from the Hiroshima International Animation Festival, Japan 2010
Best Story from Fantoche International Animation Festival, September 2010
Best Sound from Fantoche International Animation Festival, September 2010
Best Short Film award Silver Wolf from Festival du Nouveaux Cinema, Canada 2010
Grand Prix from International Animation Festival Tofuzi, Georgia 2010
Best Nordic and Baltic Short Film award from the Fredrikstad Animation Festival, Norway 2010
Prize for the Best Medium Length Film from the International Animated Film Festival CINANIMA, Portugal 2010
Award for the Best Story from the Animated Dreams, Estonia 2010
Grand Prix from International Animation Festival Anifest, Czech Republic 2011
Best International Short Film from International Animation Festival Anifilm, Czech Republic 2011
Special Distinction for the Best Direction from International Animation Festival Animanima, Serbia 2011
Grand Prix from International Animation Festival Krok, Ukraine 2011

Art exhibitions
 Tallinn, Estonia 1982, 1984, 1992
 Viitasaari, Finland 1988
 Tampere, Finland 1989
 Turku, Finland 1989
 Helsinki, Finland 1990, 1992, 1995
 Stuttgart, Germany 1990
 Volda, Molde, Grimstad, Norway 1990
 Odense, Denmark 1991
 Heidelberg, Germany 1992
 Karlsruhe, Germany 1992
 Hafnarfjörður, Ísland 1992
 Brussels, Belgium 1993
 Annecy, France 1993
 Genève, Switzerland 1993
 Harlem, Holland 1994
 Baden, Switzerland 1995
 Genève, Switzerland 1995

Notes and references

External links

1946 births
Living people
Estonian animated film directors
Estonian animators
Contemporary artists
Estonian caricaturists
People from Tallinn
Artists from Tallinn
Estonian cartoonists
20th-century Estonian male artists 
21st-century Estonian male artists 
Academic staff of the Estonian Academy of Arts
Recipients of the Order of the White Star, 3rd Class